Juan Jeremías Bogado Britos (born 4 July 1995) is a Paraguayan footballer who plays for Deportivo Municipal.

International career
he was summoned for Paraguay national under-20 football team   to play 2015 South American Youth Football Championship.

References

External links
 
 
 
 
 
 

1995 births
Living people
Paraguayan footballers
Paraguay under-20 international footballers
Paraguayan expatriate footballers
Paraguayan Primera División players
Peruvian Primera División players
Club Olimpia footballers
Deportivo Capiatá players
C.F. Pachuca players
General Caballero Sport Club footballers
Comerciantes Unidos footballers
Deportivo Municipal footballers
2015 South American Youth Football Championship players
Association football wingers
Expatriate footballers in Peru
Paraguayan expatriate sportspeople in Peru